Fourier may refer to:

People named Fourier
Joseph Fourier (1768–1830), French mathematician and physicist
Charles Fourier (1772–1837), French utopian socialist thinker
Peter Fourier (1565–1640), French saint in the Roman Catholic Church and priest of Mattaincourt

Mathematics
Fourier series, a weighted sum of sinusoids having a common period, the result of Fourier analysis of a periodic function
Fourier analysis, the description of functions as sums of sinusoids
Fourier transform, the type of linear canonical transform that is the generalization of the Fourier series
Fourier operator, the kernel of the Fredholm integral of the first kind that defines the continuous Fourier transform
Fourier inversion theorem, any one of several theorems by which Fourier inversion recovers a function from its Fourier transform
Short-time Fourier transform or short-term Fourier transform (STFT), a Fourier transform during a short term of time, used in the area of signal analysis
Fractional Fourier transform (FRFT), a linear transformation generalizing the Fourier transform, used in the area of harmonic analysis
Discrete-time Fourier transform (DTFT), the reverse of the Fourier series, a special case of the Z-transform around the unit circle in the complex plane
Discrete Fourier transform (DFT), occasionally called the finite Fourier transform, the Fourier transform of a discrete periodic sequence (yielding discrete periodic frequencies), which can also be thought of as the DTFT of a finite-length sequence evaluated at discrete frequencies
Fast Fourier transform (FFT), a fast algorithm for computing a discrete Fourier transform
Generalized Fourier series, generalizations of Fourier series that are special cases of decompositions over an orthonormal basis of an inner product space

In physics and engineering
The Fourier number (also known as the Fourier modulus), a ratio  of the rate of heat conduction  to the rate of thermal energy storage 
Fourier-transform spectroscopy, a measurement technique whereby spectra are collected based on measurements of the temporal coherence of a radiative source

See also
List of Fourier-related transforms, a list of linear transformations of functions related to Fourier analysis
Fourier (crater)

Occupational surnames

French-language surnames
Surnames of French origin
Surnames of Belgian origin